Heille is a hamlet in the Dutch province of Zeeland. It is located on the Belgium border, about 2 km west of Aardenburg in the municipality of Sluis.

Heille is not a statistical entity, and the postal authorities have placed it under Sluis.

Heille was a separate municipality until 1880.

References

Populated places in Zeeland
Former municipalities of Zeeland
Sluis